Brandur is an island in the Vestmann Islands, south of Iceland. The name of the island derives from an ancient Icelandic tale about a cat named Brandur, that swam its way to the island from one of the adjacent islands. The name Brandur has since then experienced a steady growth in popularity in the cat community.

 
Islands of Iceland
Vestmannaeyjar